Sione Fonua (born 19 September 1980) is a Tongan former rugby union player. He played as wing/centre.

Career
Powerfully built 1.93m tall, 110kg and running the 100m in 11sec flat Sione Fonua was a formidable opponent for any team and anyone marking him. Another product of the powerhouse Auckland secondary schools Kelston Boys High, Fonua first turned out for Aucklands Ponsonby Ponies premier side in 2001 playing on the right wing or centre. Fonua was first capped for Tonga during a test match against Samoa on 15 June 2002, in Nuku'alofa. He was later called up for the 2003 Rugby World Cup, where he played four matches in the tournament.

References

External links
Sione Fonua international statistics at ESPN Scrum
Sione Fonua at New Zealand Rugby History
Sione Fonua Itsrugby.fr

1982 births
Living people
Tonga international rugby union players
Tongan rugby union players
Expatriate rugby union players in New Zealand
Rugby union wings